Jesús Ramírez may refer to:

 Jesús Ramírez (Mexican footballer) (born 1957), Mexican footballer and football manager
 Jesús Ramírez (Venezuelan footballer) (born 1998), Venezuelan footballer
 Jesús Emilio Ramírez (1904–1981), Colombian geophysicist and seismologist
 Jesús Ramírez Rangel (born 1978), Mexican politician
 Jesús Ramírez Stabros (born 1963), Mexican politician